To Tadd with Love is an album by drummer Philly Joe Jones' Dameronia which was recorded and released on the Uptown label in 1982.

Reception

The AllMusic review by Scott Yanow stated "Drummer Philly Joe Jones led the group Dameronia during his last years, a band dedicated to performing the music of the great composer Tadd Dameron. ... This loving tribute (which perfectly balances the arrangements with concise solo space) is highly recommended".

Track listing
All compositions by Tadd Dameron
 "Philly J. J." – 8:37
 "Soultrane" – 5:22
 "Sid's Delight" – 5:32
 "On a Misty Night" – 9:27
 "Fontainebleau" – 4:29
 "The Scene Is Clean" – 7:48

Personnel
Philly Joe Jones – drums
Don Sickler – trumpet, director
Johnny Coles – trumpet 
Britt Woodman – trombone
Frank Wess – alto saxophone
Charles Davis – tenor saxophone
Cecil Payne – baritone saxophone
Walter Davis Jr. – piano
Larry Ridley – double bass

References

Uptown Records (jazz) albums
Philly Joe Jones albums
Dameronia albums
1982 albums